Trifora is a type of three-light window. The trifora usually appears in towers and belfries—on the top floors, where it is necessary to lighten the structure with wider openings.

Overview
The trifora has three openings divided by two small columns or pilasters, on which rest three arches, round or acute. Sometimes, the whole trifora is framed by a further large arch. The space among arches is usually decorated by a coat of arms or a circular opening. Less popular than the mullioned window, the trifora was, however, widely used in the Romanesque, Gothic, and Renaissance periods. Later, the window was mostly forgotten, coming back in vogue in the nineteenth century, in the period of eclecticism and the rediscovery of ancient styles (Neo-Gothic, Neo-Renaissance, and so on). Compared to the mullioned window, the trifora was generally used for larger and more ornate openings.

Gallery

See also
Monofora
Bifora
Quadrifora
Polifora
Diocletian window

References

 AA.VV. Enciclopedia dell'Architettura, Garzanti, Milano 1996, 
 Pevsner, Fleming e Honour, Dizionario di architettura, Utet, Torino 1978 ; ristampato come Dizionario dei termini artistici, Utet Tea, 1994

Architectural elements
Windows